Robert Cecil may refer to:

 Robert Cecil, 1st Earl of Salisbury (1563–1612), English administrator and politician, MP for Westminster, and for Hertfordshire
 Robert Cecil (1670–1716), Member of Parliament for Castle Rising, and for Wootton Basset
 Robert Cecil (MP for Old Sarum) (died 1657), English politician
 Robert Cecil, 1st Viscount Cecil of Chelwood (1864–1958) British lawyer, politician and diplomat
 Robert Cecil (British diplomat) (1913–1994), British diplomat and writer
 Robert Gascoyne-Cecil (disambiguation), several people

See also 
 Cecil Roberts (disambiguation)